A list of Minnesota Golden Gophers men's ice hockey notable players and award winners.

National

Hobey Baker Award
Neal Broten - 1981
Robb Stauber - 1988
Brian Bonin - 1996
Jordan Leopold - 2002

First Team All-Americans

John Mariucci - 1940
Harold Paulsen - 1940
Gordon Watters - 1951
Larry Ross - 1952
John Mayasich - 1954, 1955
Richard Dougherty - 1954
Jim Mattson - 1954
Ken Yackel - 1954
Richard Burg - 1958
Jack McCartan - 1958
Murray Williamson - 1959
Lou Nanne - 1963
Craig Falkman - 1964
Doug Woog - 1965
Gary Gambucci - 1968
Murray McLachlan - 1970
Wally Olds - 1970
Les Auge - 1975
Mike Polich - 1975
William Baker - 1979
Tim Harrer - 1980
Neal Broten - 1981
Steve Ulseth - 1981
Pat Micheletti - 1985
Robb Stauber - 1988
Brian Bonin - 1995, 1996
Mike Crowley - 1996, 1997
Jordan Leopold - 2001, 2002
John Pohl - 2002
Keith Ballard - 2004
Ryan Potulny - 2006
Alex Goligoski - 2007
Ryan Stoa - 2009
Mike Reilly - 2014, 2015
Tyler Sheehy - 2017
Rem Pitlick - 2019
Sampo Ranta - 2021

Western Collegiate Hockey Association

Player of the Year
Lou Nanne - 1963
Murray McLachlan - 1969, 1970
Mike Polich - 1975
Tim Harrer - 1980
Steve Ulseth - 1981
Robb Stauber - 1988
Brian Bonin - 1995, 1996
Mike Crowley - 1997

Defensive Player of the Year
Jordan Leopold - 2001, 2002
Alex Goligoski - 2007

Goaltender of the Year
Robb Stauber - 1988, 1989

Rookie of the Year
Gary Gambucci - 1966
Murray McLachlan - 1968
Aaron Broten - 1980
Darby Hendrickson - 1992
Mike Crowley - 1995
Thomas Vanek - 2003
Phil Kessel - 2006
Jordan Schroeder - 2009

Tournament MVP
Travis Richards - 1993
Chris McAlpine - 1994
Brian Bonin - 1996
Grant Potulny - 2003
Kellen Briggs - 2004
Blake Wheeler - 2007
Alex Kangas - 2008

Student-Athlete of the Year
Justin McHugh - 1995
Dan Trebil - 1996

Coach of the Year
Glen Sonmor - 1970  
Herb Brooks - 1974 
Brad Buetow - 1980  
Doug Woog - 1990 
Don Lucia - 2006

Big Ten Conference
Player of the Year
Adam Wilcox - 2014
Tyler Sheehy - 2017
Ben Meyers - 2022

Defensive Player of the Year
Mike Reilly - 2014, 2015
Jake Bischoff - 2017
Brock Faber - 2022

Goaltender of the Year
Adam Wilcox - 2014
Eric Schierhorn - 2016, 2017
Jack LaFontaine - 2021

Tournament Most Outstanding Player
Adam Wilcox - 2015
Jack LaFontaine - 2021

Coach of the Year
Don Lucia - 2014
Bob Motzko - 2022

Hall of Famers

Hockey Hall of Fame

Herb Brooks
John Mariucci

United States Hockey Hall of Fame

Herb Brooks
Aaron Broten
Neal Broten
Dick Dougherty
Rob Johnson
Reed Larson
Jack McCartan
John Mariucci
John Mayasich
Lou Nanne
Mike Ramsey
Larry Ross
Murray Williamson
Doug Woog
Ken Yackel
Martin Spasov

United States Olympic Hall of Fame

Herb Brooks (coach)
1960 Olympic Men's Ice Hockey Team:
John Mayasich
Jack McCartan
Dick Meredith
1980 Olympic Men's Ice Hockey Team:
Bill Baker
Neal Broten
Steve Christoff
Steve Janaszak
Rob McClanahan
Mike Ramsey
Buzz Schneider
Eric Strobel
Phil Verchota
Herb Brooks (coach)

Minnesota Golden Gophers men's ice hockey